At least four warships of Japan have borne the name Atago:

 , was a  launched in 1887 and sunk in 1904
 Japanese battlecruiser Atago, was an  scrapped on slip in 1924
 , was a  launched in 1930 and sunk in 1944
 , is an  launched in 2005

Japanese Navy ship names
Imperial Japanese Navy ship names